Video Fool for Love is a 1996 Australian documentary film by film editor Robert Gibson about his love life.

References

External links

Video Fool for Love at Oz Movies

Autobiographical documentary films
Australian documentary films
1996 documentary films
1996 films
Films produced by George Miller
1990s English-language films